Hendrysburg is an unincorporated community in Belmont County, in the U.S. state of Ohio.

History
Hendrysburg was laid out in 1828 by Charles Hendry, and named for him. A post office called Hendrysburgh was established in 1830, the name was changed to Hendrysburg in 1893, and the post office closed in 1983.

Notable people

 William Boyd (actor) – actor in American Western films.

References

Unincorporated communities in Belmont County, Ohio
1828 establishments in Ohio
Populated places established in 1828
Unincorporated communities in Ohio